Adriano Mascheroni (died 1531) was a Roman Catholic prelate who served as Bishop of Sora (1530–1531).

Biography
On 21 October 1530, Adriano Mascheroni was appointed during the papacy of Pope Clement VII as Bishop of Sora. He served as Bishop of Sora until his death in 1531.

References

External links and additional sources
 (for Chronology of Bishops) 
 (for Chronology of Bishops) 

16th-century Italian Roman Catholic bishops
1531 deaths
Bishops appointed by Pope Clement VII